Entertainment! is the debut album by English post-punk band Gang of Four. It was released in September 1979 through EMI Records internationally and Warner Bros. Records in North America. Stylistically, it draws heavily on punk rock but also incorporates the influence of funk, dance music, reggae and dub. Its lyrics and artwork reflected the band's left-wing political concerns. It would be an influential release in the burgeoning post-punk movement.

In 2020, Entertainment! was ranked at number 273 on Rolling Stone magazine's list of the 500 greatest albums of all time.

Composition
Entertainment! has been recognized as a seminal post-punk album. It has also been described musically as dance-punk and art punk. The album was co-produced by King and Gill along with Rob Warr, their band manager at the time. King's lyrics were heavily influenced by Situationism, feminism, and the effect of alienation on personal life; a unifying notion is that "the personal is political". Topics include commodification ("Natural's Not in It", "Return the Gift"), proletarian life ("At Home He's a Tourist"), Great Man theory ("Not Great Men"), Special Category Status prisoners in Northern Ireland ("Ether"), and the impact of media reporting of acts of terrorism and Maoist guerrilla warfare in Latin America ("5.45"). A number of songs apply these themes to challenge traditional concepts of love and love songs ("Anthrax", "Contract") and sex ("Damaged Goods", "I Found That Essence Rare"). In his 2014 monograph on the album, Kevin J. H. Dettmar likens the album to James Joyce's Ulysses, saying; "both are concerned with the importance of narrative, of storytelling, as a mode of experiencing the world... that the stories we tell ourselves about "the way things are"—a body of stories that in another context we might call ideology—profoundly shape our experiences of the world.

Artwork
The cover, designed by King, shows the influence of the Situationist International, a group which became famous during the Paris '68 student-led revolution in France. It depicts an "Indian" shaking hands with a "cowboy" in three heavily processed versions of the same image, based on a still from one of the Winnetou films starring Lex Barker and Pierre Brice, which had once been popular in communist East Germany as critical narratives of capitalism. The faces are reduced to blobs of red and white — that is, to the stereotypical racial colours. A text that winds around the images reads, "The Indian smiles, he thinks that the cowboy is his friend. The cowboy smiles, he is glad the Indian is fooled. Now he can exploit him." In this way, it approaches themes of exploitation, but taken with the lyrical content of the album, it may also point to simplistic depictions of ethnic, social or political conflict in the media as "cowboys and Indians".

The album's back cover depicts a family whose father says, "I spend most of our money on myself so that I can stay fat", while the mother and children declare, "We're grateful for his leftovers". On the album's inner sleeve, designed by Gill, small photographs depicting scenes shown on television are interlaced with text illustrating what the band suggests are the misleading subtexts of media presentation: "The facts are presented neutrally so that the public can make up its own mind"; "Men act heroically to defend their country"; "People are given what they want".

Release
"At Home He's a Tourist" reached number 58 in the UK Singles Chart, the highest position of any Gang of Four song. The band were originally asked to perform the song on Top of the Pops. However, when the show's producers heard the line "And the rubbers you hide in your top left pocket" they asked the group to change the word rubbers to rubbish for fear of causing offence; the four band members refused and the appearance was cancelled.

In 2005, the band performed the album live in its entirety as part of the All Tomorrow's Parties-curated Don't Look Back series. In 2009, King wrote a track by track commentary on the album for Clash. Hugo Burnham's memories of making the album were published in 2014 on the 35th anniversary of the release of the album.

Reception

Entertainment! was ranked the fifth best album of 1979 by NME. Reviewing the album in Rolling Stone in 1980, David Fricke regarded Entertainment! as "the best debut album by a British band – punk or otherwise – since the original English release of The Clash in 1977". Creems RJ Smith, looking back on Entertainment! in 1984, found it to be "the most difficult Gang album, because it's so damn hard to find the front door to the thing. The ugly emotions Entertainment! dredges up are almost freakish, and all the more unsettling for the way they poke unexpectedly through the record's detached, architectonic front."

In 2004, Pitchfork listed Entertainment! as the eighth best album of the 1970s. In 2003, Rolling Stone ranked the album at number 490 on its list of the 500 greatest albums of all time, raising the album's rank to number 483 in their 2012 update of the list, saying that its "stiff, jerky aggression... invented a new style that influenced bands from the Minutemen to LCD Soundsystem". In their 2020 reboot of the list, Rolling Stone ranked the album number 273.  In March 2005, Q placed the track "At Home He's a Tourist" at number 52 on its list of the "100 Greatest Guitar Tracks". As of 2009, Entertainment! has sold more than 100,000 copies in the UK. The album was also included in the book 1001 Albums You Must Hear Before You Die.

The album has also attracted praise from rock musicians. Kurt Cobain listed it as one of his 50 favourite albums of all time. Flea of the Red Hot Chili Peppers stated that the first time he heard the record, "It completely changed the way I looked at rock music and sent me on my trip as a bass player." Michael Stipe of R.E.M. has stated, "Gang of Four could really swing. I stole a lot from them."

Use in other media 
"Natural's Not in It" was used during the title sequence of the 2006 film Marie Antoinette. In 2010, Microsoft used the same song in sports-focused advertisements for the Kinect, its motion-based control system for the Xbox 360 video game system.

"Anthrax" was used in the 2004 remake of The Manchurian Candidate and in the 1986 film Dogs in Space, which featured Michael Hutchence in the lead role. Hutchence cited Gang of Four as a major influence on his band, INXS.

In 2014, Kevin J. H. Dettmar's monograph on the album was published as part of Bloomsbury's 33⅓ series on classic albums.

Track listing

1995 bonus tracks
EMI Records CD issue (mastered by Andy Gill and Jon King) includes the following singles:
"Outside the Trains Don't Run on Time" – 3:27
"He'd Send in the Army" – 3:40
"It's Her Factory" – 3:08

Infinite Zero Archive/American Recordings CD issue includes the Yellow EP:
"Armalite Rifle" – 2:48

2005 bonus tracks
In addition to the Yellow EP, the Rhino release adds four previously unissued tracks:
"Guns Before Butter" (alternate version) – 4:25
"Contract" (alternate version) – 2:48
"Blood Free" (live at The Electric Ballroom, London) – 3:17
"Sweet Jane" (live at the American Indian Center) (Lou Reed) – 3:20

Personnel
Gang of Four
 Jon King – lead vocals (1, 3, 7–9), co-lead vocals (1, 4–6, 10, 12), backing vocals (2, 11), melodica (1, 11), art design
 Andy Gill – guitar, lead vocals (2, 11), co-lead vocals (1, 4–6, 10, 12), backing vocals (3, 7–9), art design
 Dave Allen – bass guitar, backing vocals (3, 5, 7, 12)
 Hugo Burnham – drums

Technical personnel
Edwin Cross – tape operators
Davy Phee – tape operators
Rik Walton – engineer

Charts 
 Album

 Singles

References 

Sources
 
 
 
 

1979 debut albums
Gang of Four (band) albums
EMI Records albums
Warner Records albums
Albums produced by Andy Gill